San Antonio Sacatepéquez is a municipality in the San Marcos department of Guatemala.

Communities

Climate

San Antonio Sacatepéqueztiene clima templado (Köppen:Cwb).

Geographic location 
San Antonio Sacatepéquez is located 9 km SE of San Marcos.

References

Municipalities of the San Marcos Department